The Girls' Doubles tournament of the 2013 Asian Junior Badminton Championships was held from July 10–14 in Kota Kinabalu, Malaysia. South Korean pair Lee So-hee and Shin Seung-chan were the gold medalist in the last edition. The top two seeded Lam Narissapat / Puttita Supajirakul of Thailand and Chae Yoo-jung / Kim Ji-won of South Korea finished in the semifinals round, and settle for the bronze medal. The gold medal went to Chinese pair Huang Dongping and Jia Yifan after an all-Chinese final versus their teammates Chen Qingchen and He Jiaxin that they won by 21–19, 21–16.

Seeded

  Lam Narissapat / Puttita Supajirakul (semi-final)
  Chae Yoo-jung / Kim Ji-won (semifinal)
  Joyce Choong Wai Chi / Yap Cheng Wen (quarter-final)
  Chen Qingchen / He Jiaxin (final)
  Setyana Mapasa / Rosyita Eka Putri Sari (third round)
  Chisato Hoshi / Ayako Sakuramoto (quarterfinal)
  Pacharapun Chochuwong / Chanisa Teachavorasinskun (third round)
  Chang Ya-han / Shih Yi-chu (third round)

Draw

Finals

Top Half

Section 1

Section 2

Section 3

Section 4

Bottom Half

Section 5

Section 6

Section 7

Section 8

References

External links 
Main Draw (Archived 2013-07-13)

2013 Asian Junior Badminton Championships
Junior